Karaf may refer to:
Karaf, Tonekabon, a village in Mazandaran Province, Iran
Apache Karaf, an OSGi distribution offered by the Apache Software Foundation based on Apache Felix

See also
Karafs, a village in Hamadan Province, Iran
Korf (disambiguation)